A phonograph, in its later forms also called a gramophone (as a trademark since 1887, as a generic name in the UK since 1910) or since the 1940s called a record player, or more recently a turntable, is a device for the mechanical and analogue recording and reproduction of sound. The sound vibration waveforms are recorded as corresponding physical deviations of a spiral groove engraved, etched, incised, or impressed into the surface of a rotating cylinder or disc, called a "record". To recreate the sound, the surface is similarly rotated while a playback stylus traces the groove and is therefore vibrated by it, very faintly reproducing the recorded sound. In early acoustic phonographs, the stylus vibrated a diaphragm which produced sound waves which were coupled to the open air through a flaring horn, or directly to the listener's ears through stethoscope-type earphones.

The phonograph was invented in 1877 by Thomas Edison. Alexander Graham Bell's Volta Laboratory made several improvements in the 1880s and introduced the graphophone, including the use of wax-coated cardboard cylinders and a cutting stylus that moved from side to side in a zigzag groove around the record. In the 1890s, Emile Berliner initiated the transition from phonograph cylinders to flat discs with a spiral groove running from the periphery to near the center, coining the term gramophone for disc record players, which is predominantly used in many languages. Later improvements through the years included modifications to the turntable and its drive system, the stylus or needle, pickup system, and the sound and equalization systems.

The disc phonograph record was the dominant commercial audio recording format throughout most of the 20th century. In the 1960s, the use of 8-track cartridges and cassette tapes were introduced as alternatives. In the 1980s, phonograph use declined sharply due to the popularity of cassettes and the rise of the compact disc, as well as the later introduction of digital music distribution in the 2000s. However, records are still a favorite format for some audiophiles, DJs, collectors, and turntablists (particularly in hip hop and electronic dance music), and have undergone a revival since the 2000s.

Terminology 
Usage of terminology is not uniform across the English-speaking world (see below). In more modern usage, the playback device is often called a "turntable", "record player", or "record changer", although each of these terms denote categorically distinct items. When used in conjunction with a mixer as part of a DJ setup, turntables are often colloquially called "decks". In later electric phonographs (more often known since the 1940s as record players or turntables), the motions of the stylus are converted into an analogous electrical signal by a transducer, then converted back into sound by a loudspeaker. The similar related terms gramophone (from the Greek   'letter' and   'voice') and graphophone have similar root meanings.

In British English, "gramophone" may refer to any sound-reproducing machine using disc records, which were introduced and popularized in the UK by the Gramophone Company. Originally, "gramophone" was a proprietary trademark of that company and any use of the name by competing makers of disc records was vigorously prosecuted in the courts, but in 1910 an English court decision decreed that it had become a generic term;

United States 

In American English, "phonograph", properly specific to machines made by Edison, was sometimes used in a generic sense as early as the 1890s to include cylinder-playing machines made by others. But it was then considered strictly incorrect to apply it to Emile Berliner's Gramophone, a very different machine which played nonrecordable discs (although Edison's original Phonograph patent included the use of discs.)

Australia 

In Australian English, "record player" was the term; "turntable" was a more technical term; "gramophone" was restricted to the old mechanical (i.e., wind-up) players; and "phonograph" was used as in British English. The "phonograph" was first demonstrated in Australia on 14 June 1878 to a meeting of the Royal Society of Victoria by the Society's Honorary Secretary, Alex Sutherland who published "The Sounds of the Consonants, as Indicated by the Phonograph" in the Society's journal in November that year. On 8 August 1878 the phonograph was publicly demonstrated at the Society's annual conversazione, along with a range of other new inventions, including the microphone.

Early history

Phonautograph 

The phonautograph was invented on March 25, 1857, by Frenchman Édouard-Léon Scott de Martinville, an editor and typographer of manuscripts at a scientific publishing house in Paris. One day while editing Professor Longet's Traité de Physiologie, he happened upon that customer's engraved illustration of the anatomy of the human ear, and conceived of "the imprudent idea of photographing the word." In 1853 or 1854 (Scott cited both years) he began working on "le problème de la parole s'écrivant elle-même" ("the problem of speech writing itself"), aiming to build a device that could replicate the function of the human ear.

Scott coated a plate of glass with a thin layer of lampblack. He then took an acoustic trumpet, and at its tapered end affixed a thin membrane that served as the analog to the eardrum. At the center of that membrane, he attached a rigid boar's bristle approximately a centimeter long, placed so that it just grazed the lampblack. As the glass plate was slid horizontally in a well formed groove at a speed of one meter per second, a person would speak into the trumpet, causing the membrane to vibrate and the stylus to trace figures that were scratched into the lampblack. On March 25, 1857, Scott received the French patent #17,897/31,470 for his device, which he called a phonautograph. The earliest known surviving recorded sound of a human voice was conducted on April 9, 1860, when Scott recorded someone singing the song "Au Clair de la Lune" ("By the Light of the Moon") on the device. However, the device was not designed to play back sounds, as Scott intended for people to read back the tracings, which he called phonautograms. This was not the first time someone had used a device to create direct tracings of the vibrations of sound-producing objects, as tuning forks had been used in this way by English physicist Thomas Young in 1807. By late 1857, with support from the Société d'encouragement pour l'industrie nationale, Scott's phonautograph was recording sounds with sufficient precision to be adopted by the scientific community, paving the way for the nascent science of acoustics.

The device's true significance in the history of recorded sound was not fully realized prior to March 2008, when it was discovered and resurrected in a Paris patent office by First Sounds, an informal collaborative of American audio historians, recording engineers, and sound archivists founded to make the earliest sound recordings available to the public. The phonautograms were then digitally converted by scientists at the Lawrence Berkeley National Laboratory in California, who were able to play back the recorded sounds, something Scott had never conceived of. Prior to this point, the earliest known record of a human voice was thought to be an 1877 phonograph recording by Thomas Edison. The phonautograph would play a role in the development of the gramophone, whose inventor, Emile Berliner, worked with the phonautograph in the course of developing his own device.

Paleophone 
Charles Cros, a French poet and amateur scientist, is the first person known to have made the conceptual leap from recording sound as a traced line to the theoretical possibility of reproducing the sound from the tracing and then to devising a definite method for accomplishing the reproduction. On April 30, 1877, he deposited a sealed envelope containing a summary of his ideas with the French Academy of Sciences, a standard procedure used by scientists and inventors to establish priority of conception of unpublished ideas in the event of any later dispute.

An account of his invention was published on October 10, 1877, by which date Cros had devised a more direct procedure: the recording stylus could scribe its tracing through a thin coating of acid-resistant material on a metal surface and the surface could then be etched in an acid bath, producing the desired groove without the complication of an intermediate photographic procedure.

Cros was a poet of meager means, not in a position to pay a machinist to build a working model, and largely content to bequeath his ideas to the public domain free of charge and let others reduce them to practice, but after the earliest reports of Edison's presumably independent invention crossed the Atlantic he had his sealed letter of April 30 opened and read at the December 3, 1877 meeting of the French Academy of Sciences, claiming due scientific credit for priority of conception.

Throughout the first decade (1890–1900) of commercial production of the earliest crude disc records, the direct acid-etch method first invented by Cros was used to create the metal master discs, but Cros was not around to claim any credit or to witness the humble beginnings of the eventually rich phonographic library he had foreseen. He had died in 1888 at the age of 45.

The early phonographs 

Thomas Edison conceived the principle of recording and reproducing sound between May and July 1877 as a byproduct of his efforts to "play back" recorded telegraph messages and to automate speech sounds for transmission by telephone. His first experiments were with waxed paper. He announced his invention of the first phonograph, a device for recording and replaying sound, on November 21, 1877 (early reports appear in Scientific American and several newspapers in the beginning of November, and an even earlier announcement of Edison working on a 'talking-machine' can be found in the Chicago Daily Tribune on May 9 ), and he demonstrated the device for the first time on November 29 (it was patented on February 19, 1878, as US Patent 200,521). "In December, 1877, a young man came into the office of the Scientific American, and placed before the editors a small, simple machine about which very few preliminary remarks were offered. The visitor without any ceremony whatever turned the crank, and to the astonishment of all present the machine said: 'Good morning. How do you do? How do you like the phonograph?' The machine thus spoke for itself, and made known the fact that it was the phonograph..."

The music critic Herman Klein attended an early demonstration (1881–2) of a similar machine. On the early phonograph's reproductive capabilities he writes "It sounded to my ear like someone singing about half a mile away, or talking at the other end of a big hall; but the effect was rather pleasant, save for a peculiar nasal quality wholly due to the mechanism, though there was little of the scratching which later was a prominent feature of the flat disc. Recording for that primitive machine was a comparatively simple matter. I had to keep my mouth about six inches away from the horn and remember not to make my voice too loud if I wanted anything approximating to a clear reproduction; that was all. When it was played over to me and I heard my own voice for the first time, one or two friends who were present said that it sounded rather like mine; others declared that they would never have recognised it. I daresay both opinions were correct."

The Argus newspaper from Melbourne, Australia, reported on an 1878 demonstration at the Royal Society of Victoria, writing "There was a large attendance of ladies and gentlemen, who appeared greatly interested in the various scientific instruments exhibited. Among these the most interesting, perhaps, was the trial made by Mr. Sutherland with the phonograph, which was most amusing. Several trials were made, and were all more or less successful. "Rule Britannia" was distinctly repeated, but great laughter was caused by the repetition of the convivial song of "He's a jolly good fellow," which sounded as if it was being sung by an old man of 80 with a very cracked voice."

Early machines

Edison's early phonographs recorded onto a thin sheet of metal, normally tinfoil, which was temporarily wrapped around a helically grooved cylinder mounted on a correspondingly threaded rod supported by plain and threaded bearings. While the cylinder was rotated and slowly progressed along its axis, the airborne sound vibrated a diaphragm connected to a stylus that indented the foil into the cylinder's groove, thereby recording the vibrations as "hill-and-dale" variations of the depth of the indentation.

Introduction of the disc record

By 1890, record manufacturers had begun using a rudimentary duplication process to mass-produce their product. While the live performers recorded the master phonograph, up to ten tubes led to blank cylinders in other phonographs. Until this development, each record had to be custom-made. Before long, a more advanced pantograph-based process made it possible to simultaneously produce 90–150 copies of each record. However, as demand for certain records grew, popular artists still needed to re-record and re-re-record their songs. Reportedly, the medium's first major African-American star George Washington Johnson was obliged to perform his "The Laughing Song" (or the separate "The Whistling Coon") literally thousands of times in a studio during his recording career. Sometimes he would sing "The Laughing Song" more than fifty times in a day, at twenty cents per rendition. (The average price of a single cylinder in the mid-1890s was about fifty cents.)

Oldest surviving recordings 
Lambert's lead cylinder recording for an experimental talking clock is often identified as the oldest surviving playable sound recording,
although the evidence advanced for its early date is controversial.
Wax phonograph cylinder recordings of Handel's choral music made on June 29, 1888, at The Crystal Palace in London were thought to be the oldest-known surviving musical recordings, until the recent playback by a group of American historians of a phonautograph recording of Au clair de la lune made on April 9, 1860.

The 1860 phonautogram had not until then been played, as it was only a transcription of sound waves into graphic form on paper for visual study. Recently developed optical scanning and image processing techniques have given new life to early recordings by making it possible to play unusually delicate or physically unplayable media without physical contact.

A recording made on a sheet of tinfoil at an 1878 demonstration of Edison's phonograph in St. Louis, Missouri, has been played back by optical scanning and digital analysis. A few other early tinfoil recordings are known to survive, including a slightly earlier one which is believed to preserve the voice of U.S. President Rutherford B. Hayes, but as of May 2014 they have not yet been scanned. These antique tinfoil recordings, which have typically been stored folded, are too fragile to be played back with a stylus without seriously damaging them. Edison's 1877 tinfoil recording of Mary Had a Little Lamb, not preserved, has been called the first instance of recorded verse.

On the occasion of the 50th anniversary of the phonograph, Edison recounted reciting Mary Had a Little Lamb to test his first machine. The 1927 event was filmed by an early sound-on-film newsreel camera, and an audio clip from that film's soundtrack is sometimes mistakenly presented as the original 1877 recording.
Wax cylinder recordings made by 19th century media legends such as P. T. Barnum and Shakespearean actor Edwin Booth are amongst the earliest verified recordings by the famous that have survived to the present.

Improvements at the Volta Laboratory 

Alexander Graham Bell and his two associates took Edison's tinfoil phonograph and modified it considerably to make it reproduce sound from wax instead of tinfoil. They began their work at Bell's Volta Laboratory in Washington, D. C., in 1879, and continued until they were granted basic patents in 1886 for recording in wax.

Although Edison had invented the phonograph in 1877, the fame bestowed on him for this invention was not due to its efficiency. Recording with his tinfoil phonograph was too difficult to be practical, as the tinfoil tore easily, and even when the stylus was properly adjusted, its reproduction of sound was distorted, and good for only a few playbacks; nevertheless Edison had discovered the idea of sound recording. However immediately after his discovery he did not improve it, allegedly because of an agreement to spend the next five years developing the New York City electric light and power system.

Volta's early challenge 
Meanwhile, Bell, a scientist and experimenter at heart, was looking for new worlds to conquer after having patented the telephone. According to Sumner Tainter, it was through Gardiner Green Hubbard that Bell took up the phonograph challenge. Bell had married Hubbard's daughter Mabel in 1879 while Hubbard was president of the Edison Speaking Phonograph Co., and his organization, which had purchased the Edison patent, was financially troubled because people did not want to buy a machine which seldom worked well and proved difficult for the average person to operate.

Volta Graphophone 

The sound vibrations had been indented in the wax which had been applied to the Edison phonograph. The following was the text of one of their recordings: "There are more things in heaven and earth, Horatio, than are dreamed of in your philosophy. I am a Graphophone and my mother was a phonograph." Most of the disc machines designed at the Volta Lab had their disc mounted on vertical turntables. The explanation is that in the early experiments, the turntable, with disc, was mounted on the shop lathe, along with the recording and reproducing heads. Later, when the complete models were built, most of them featured vertical turntables.

One interesting exception was a horizontal seven inch turntable. The machine, although made in 1886, was a duplicate of one made earlier but taken to Europe by Chichester Bell. Tainter was granted  on July 10, 1888. The playing arm is rigid, except for a pivoted vertical motion of 90 degrees to allow removal of the record or a return to starting position. While recording or playing, the record not only rotated, but moved laterally under the stylus, which thus described a spiral, recording 150 grooves to the inch.

The basic distinction between the Edison's first phonograph patent and the Bell and Tainter patent of 1886 was the method of recording. Edison's method was to indent the sound waves on a piece of tin foil, while Bell and Tainter's invention called for cutting, or "engraving", the sound waves into a wax record with a sharp recording stylus.

Graphophone commercialization

In 1885, when the Volta Associates were sure that they had a number of practical inventions, they filed patent applications and began to seek out investors. The Volta Graphophone Company of Alexandria, Virginia, was created on January 6, 1886, and incorporated on February 3, 1886. It was formed to control the patents and to handle the commercial development of their sound recording and reproduction inventions, one of which became the first Dictaphone.

After the Volta Associates gave several demonstrations in the City of Washington, businessmen from Philadelphia created the American Graphophone Company on March 28, 1887, in order to produce and sell the machines for the budding phonograph marketplace. The Volta Graphophone Company then merged with American Graphophone, which itself later evolved into Columbia Records.

A coin-operated version of the Graphophone, was developed by Tainter in 1893 to compete with nickel-in-the-slot entertainment phonograph  demonstrated in 1889 by Louis T. Glass, manager of the Pacific Phonograph Company.

The work of the Volta Associates laid the foundation for the successful use of dictating machines in business, because their wax recording process was practical and their machines were durable. But it would take several more years and the renewed efforts of Edison and the further improvements of Emile Berliner and many others, before the recording industry became a major factor in home entertainment.

Disc vs. cylinder as a recording medium
Discs (that aren't re-recordable) are not inherently better than cylinders at providing audio fidelity. Rather, the advantages of the format are seen in the manufacturing process: discs can be stamped, and the matrixes to stamp disc can be shipped to other printing plants for a global distribution of recordings; cylinders could not be stamped until 1901–1902, when the gold moulding process was introduced by Edison.

Through experimentation, in 1892 Berliner began commercial production of his disc records and "gramophones". His "gramophone record" was the first disc record to be offered to the public. Seven-inch (17.5 cm) records followed in 1895. Also in 1895 Berliner replaced the hard rubber used to make the discs with a shellac compound. Berliner's early records had very poor sound quality, however. Work by Eldridge R. Johnson eventually improved the sound fidelity to a point where it was as good as the cylinder.

Dominance of the disc record

In the 1930s, vinyl (originally known as vinylite) was introduced as a record material for radio transcription discs, and for radio commercials. At that time, virtually no discs for home use were made from this material. Vinyl was used for the popular 78-rpm V-discs issued to US soldiers during World War II. This significantly reduced breakage during transport. The first commercial vinylite record was the set of five 12" discs "Prince Igor" (Asch Records album S-800, dubbed from Soviet masters in 1945). Victor began selling some home-use vinyl 78s in late 1945; but most 78s were made of a shellac compound until the 78-rpm format was completely phased out. (Shellac records were heavier and more brittle.) 33s and 45s were, however, made exclusively of vinyl, with the exception of some 45s manufactured out of polystyrene.

First all-transistor phonograph

In 1955, Philco developed and produced the world's first all-transistor phonograph models TPA-1 and TPA-2, which were announced in the June 28, 1955 edition of the Wall Street Journal. Philco started to sell these all-transistor phonographs in the fall of 1955, for the price of $59.95. The October 1955 issue of Radio & Television News magazine (page 41), had a full page detailed article on Philco's new consumer product. The all-transistor portable phonograph TPA-1 and TPA-2 models played only 45rpm records and used four 1.5 volt "D" batteries for their power supply. The "TPA" stands for "Transistor Phonograph Amplifier". Their circuitry used three Philco germanium PNP alloy-fused junction audio frequency transistors. After the 1956 season had ended, Philco decided to discontinue both models, for transistors were too expensive compared to vacuum tubes, but by 1961 a $49.95 ($ in ) portable, battery-powered radio-phonograph with seven transistors was available.

First direct-drive turntable
The first direct-drive turntable was invented by Shuichi Obata, an engineer at Matsushita (now Panasonic). In 1969, Matsushita released it as the SP-10. the first direct-drive turntable on the market.

The most influential turntable was the Technics SL-1200. Since then, turntablism spread widely in hip hop culture, and the SL-1200 remained the most widely used turntable in DJ culture for the next several decades.

Arm systems

Linear tracking
Early developments in linear turntables were from Rek-O-Kut (portable lathe/phonograph) and Ortho-Sonic in the 1950s, and Acoustical in the early 1960s. These were eclipsed by more successful implementations of the concept from the late 1960s through the early 1980s.

Pickup systems

Additionally, cartridges may contain styli or needles that can be separated according to their tip: Spherical styli and elliptical styli. Spherical styli have their tip shaped like one half of a sphere, and elliptical styli have their tip shaped like one end of an ellipse. Spherical styli preserve more of the groove of the record than elliptical styli, while elliptical styli offer higher sound quality.

Optical readout 
A few specialist laser turntables read the groove optically using a laser pickup. Since there is no physical contact with the record, no wear is incurred. However, this "no wear" advantage is debatable, since vinyl records have been tested to withstand even 1200 plays with no significant audio degradation, provided that it is played with a high quality cartridge and that the surfaces are clean.

An alternative approach is to take a high-resolution photograph or scan of each side of the record and interpret the image of the grooves using computer software. An amateur attempt using a flatbed scanner lacked satisfactory fidelity. A professional system employed by the Library of Congress produces excellent quality.

Stylus 

A development in stylus form came about by the attention to the CD-4 quadraphonic sound modulation process, which requires up to 50 kHz frequency response, with cartridges like Technics EPC-100CMK4 capable of playback on frequencies up to 100 kHz. This requires a stylus with a narrow side radius, such as 5 µm (or 0.2 mil). A narrow-profile elliptical stylus is able to read the higher frequencies (greater than 20 kHz), but at an increased wear, since the contact surface is narrower. For overcoming this problem, the Shibata stylus was invented around 1972 in Japan by Norio Shibata of JVC.

The Shibata-designed stylus offers a greater contact surface with the groove, which in turn means less pressure over the vinyl surface and thus less wear. A positive side effect is that the greater contact surface also means the stylus will read sections of the vinyl that were not touched (or "worn") by the common spherical stylus. In a demonstration by JVC records "worn" after 500 plays at a relatively very high 4.5 gf tracking force with a spherical stylus, played "as new" with the Shibata profile.

Other advanced stylus shapes appeared following the same goal of increasing contact surface, improving on the Shibata. Chronologically: "Hughes" Shibata variant (1975), "Ogura" (1978), Van den Hul (1982). Such a stylus may be marketed as "Hyperelliptical" (Shure), "Alliptic", "Fine Line" (Ortofon), "Line contact" (Audio Technica), "Polyhedron", "LAC", or "Stereohedron" (Stanton).

A keel-shaped diamond stylus appeared as a byproduct of the invention of the CED Videodisc. This, together with laser-diamond-cutting technologies, made possible the "ridge" shaped stylus, such as the Namiki (1985) design, and Fritz Gyger (1989) design. This type of stylus is marketed as "MicroLine" (Audio technica), "Micro-Ridge" (Shure), or "Replicant" (Ortofon).

Record materials 
To address the problem of steel needle wear upon records, which resulted in the cracking of the latter, RCA Victor devised unbreakable records in 1930, by mixing polyvinyl chloride with plasticisers, in a proprietary formula they called Victrolac, which was first used in 1931, in motion picture discs.

Equalization
Since the late 1950s, almost all phono input stages have used the RIAA equalization standard. Before settling on that standard, there were many different equalizations in use, including EMI, HMV, Columbia, Decca FFRR, NAB, Ortho, BBC transcription, etc. Recordings made using these other equalization schemes will typically sound odd if they are played through a RIAA-equalized preamplifier. High-performance (so-called "multicurve disc") preamplifiers, which include multiple, selectable equalizations, are no longer commonly available. However, some vintage preamplifiers, such as the LEAK varislope series, are still obtainable and can be refurbished. Newer preamplifiers like the Esoteric Sound Re-Equalizer or the K-A-B MK2 Vintage Signal Processor are also available.

In the 21st century

Turntables continued to be manufactured and sold in the 2010s, although in small numbers. While some people still like the sound of vinyl records over that of digital music sources (mainly compact discs), they represent a minority of listeners. As of 2015, the sale of vinyl LPs has increased 49–50% percent from the previous year, although small in comparison to the sale of other formats which although more units were sold (Digital Sales, CDs) the more modern formats experienced a decline in sales.

In 2017, vinyl LP sales were slightly decreased, at a rate of 5%, in comparison to previous years' numbers, regardless of the noticeable rise of vinyl records sales worldwide.

Although largely replaced since the introduction of the compact disc in 1982, record albums still sell in small numbers and are available through numerous sources. In 2008, LP sales grew by 90% over 2007, with 1.9 million records sold.

USB turntables have a built-in audio interface, which transfers the sound directly to the connected computer. Some USB turntables transfer the audio without equalization, but are sold with software that allows the EQ of the transferred audio file to be adjusted. There are also many turntables on the market designed to be plugged into a computer via a USB port for needle dropping purposes.

See also 

 Archéophone, used to convert diverse types of cylinder recordings to modern CD media
 Audio signal processing
 Compressed air gramophone
 List of phonograph manufacturers
 Talking Machine World
 Vinyl killer

Notes

References

Further reading
 Bruil, Rudolf A. (January 8, 2004). "Linear Tonearms." Retrieved on July 25, 2011.
 Gelatt, Roland. The Fabulous Phonograph, 1877–1977. Second rev. ed., [being also the] First Collier Books ed., in series, Sounds of the Century. New York: Collier, 1977. 349 p., ill. 
Heumann, Michael. "Metal Machine Music: The Phonograph's Voice and the Transformation of Writing." eContact! 14.3 — Turntablism (January 2013). Montréal: CEC.
 Koenigsberg, Allen. The Patent History of the Phonograph, 1877–1912. APM Press, 1991.
 
 Various. "Turntable [wiki]: Bibliography." eContact! 14.3 — Turntablism (January 2013). Montréal: CEC.
 Weissenbrunner, Karin. "Experimental Turntablism: Historical overview of experiments with record players / records — or Scratches from Second-Hand Technology." eContact! 14.3 — Turntablism (January 2013). Montréal: CEC.
 Carson, B. H.; Burt, A. D.; Reiskind, and H. I., "A Record Changer And Record Of Complementary Design", RCA Review, June 1949

External links 

 c.1915 Swiss hot-air engined gramophone at Museum of Retro Technology
 Interactive sculpture delivers tactile soundwave experience
 Very early recordings from around the world
 The Birth of the Recording Industry
 The Cylinder Archive
 The Berliner Sound and Image Archive
 Cylinder Preservation & Digitization Project – Over 6,000 cylinder recordings held by the Department of Special Collections, University of California, Santa Barbara, free for download or streamed online.
 Cylinder players held at the British Library – information and high-quality images.
 History of Recorded Sound: Phonographs and Records
 EnjoytheMusic.com – Excerpts from the book Hi-Fi All-New 1958 Edition
 Listen to early recordings on the Edison Phonograph
 Mario Frazzetto's Phonograph and Gramophone Gallery.
 Say What? – Essay on phonograph technology and intellectual property law
 Vinyl Engine – Information, images, articles and reviews from around the world
 The Analogue Dept – Information, images and tutorials; strongly focused on Thorens brand
 45 rpm player and changer at work on YouTube
 Historic video footage of Edison operating his original tinfoil phonograph
 Turntable History on Enjoy the Music.com
 2-point and Arc Protractor generators on AlignmentProtractor.com

Audiovisual introductions in 1877
American inventions
Audio players
Thomas Edison
Sound recording
Hip hop production
Turntablism
19th-century inventions